Chris King (born 29 November 1969) is an Australian former professional rugby league footballer who played for the Parramatta Eels in the 1990s. 

King is the older brother of former professional rugby league footballer Matt King.
At the end of his playing career, King was made a life member of the club in 1997.

References

1973 births
Living people
Australian rugby league players
Parramatta Eels players
Rugby league second-rows
Place of birth missing (living people)